Classic rallying, or historic rallying, is a type of road rally suitable for most standard classic cars, with no special equipment needed (the equipment allowed depends on the particular rally). These rallies are more about enjoyment than speed, and can be a good introduction to historic motorsport (which also include race meetings, classic endurance, and hillclimbing). A classic road rally is not about speed; in fact, there are severe penalties for finishing too early. The idea of a rally is to travel from a point to another within a certain time (time controls), not too fast or too slow, trying to match a speed average set by the organizers.

Classic rallies 
Classic rallies can be classified as 
 mixed competition and regularity rallies
 competitive regularity and endurance
 touring rally

Touring rallying is all about enjoying countryside and the company of classic car owners.

In regularity rallies, a series of intermediate time controls must be visited in the correct order. At each control point, the team stops and has time recorded on a card. At the end of the event, the competitor who has visited all these controls and who has the fewest early or late penalties overall is the winner. Note that with the introduction of electronics, control points can be replaced by sensors which trigger the cars at their given time thanks to a transponder, enabling much accurate penalties system.

Endurance rallies are long-distance motor rallies for vintage, historic and classic cars.

Classic rallies try to relive some of the great events of the 1960s and 1970s when man and machine were often alone for hours, even days, with little support. Cars now have expendable parts and a gearbox can be changed in twenty minutes. On the long tough rallies of yesteryear drivers had to drive 3000 km exclusively up and down the French Alps, against the clock for most of the way, and look after the gearbox and every other part of the car, since changing them was impossible. Liège-Sofia-Liège, for example, being almost a flat out drive from Belgium to Bulgaria and back, through the roughest roads the length of Yugoslavia and over the difficult passes like the Gavia and the Vivione in Italy. Service was wherever the service crews could reach and was usually limited to a change of tires, refueling and, if the team was lucky, only minor repairs, since any time used for service had to be made up on the road by the driver.

In the 1960s and 70s more than half of the competitive distance on the classic rallies was run at night. For example, Monte Carlo Rally had long sections running through the Chartreuse mountains between Chambéry and Grenoble before crossing the Rhone valley and continuing in what was often the deeply snowbound and ice covered Ardèche, all in the same night.

The road book 
In most events, participants are given a road book essential for the race. This map style book is a straightforward ball and arrow system to show the route. The name of tulip diagram, usually used to describe the road book diagrams come from the Tulip Rally (Tulpen rally) of the 1950s. It gives a diagrammatic representation of the road junction. Participants would be instructed to religiously follow the mileages on the left of the page to ensure that they were at the correct junction, for which an odometer could be used.

Famous rallies 
Famous rallies that now have a revival edition are for example:
 Safari Rally
 Monte Carlo Rally
 Acropolis Rally
 Rallye Sanremo
 Tulip Rally
 Tour de Corse
 Lombard Revival
 Legend Boucles de Spa
 Liège-Sofia-Liège

Famous rally drivers 
Famous drivers of the 60s and 70s
 Erik Carlsson
 Vic Elford
 Brian Redman
 Björn Waldegård
 Jean-Claude Andruet
 Gérard Larrousse
 Walter Röhrl
 Timo Mäkinen
 Markku Alén

See also
Vintage car
Classic car
Table-Top Rallying
Historic motorsport

External links 
 Classic Rallies calendar - Classic Rallies worldwide calendar.
 Rallye Co-Pilot - Classic Rally App for iPhone and iPad
 Rallymeter - Classic Rallies tool app for iPhone / iPad / Android
  - Driving on a section of the two storied races
Rally racing